Ectoedemia turbidella is a moth of the family Nepticulidae. It is found from most of Europe (except Ireland, Greece and the Mediterranean islands), east to the Volga and Ural regions of Russia.

The wingspan is 6–7 mm.  The wing ground colour is grey There are creamy white forewing patches and the head has an orange or yellowish tuft and whitish eyecaps. Adults are on wing from May to June.

The larvae feed on Populus alba and Populus canescens. They mine the leaves of their host plant. It first bores in the distal part of the petiole, resulting in a local swelling. When the larva reaches the leaf it makes an elongate triangular blotch between the leaf margin and the first side vein, or sometimes between midrib and side vein. The frass is concentrated in two bands that run parallel to the sides of the mine. The larvae mainly feed at night. Pupation takes place outside the mine.

External links
bladmineerders.nl
Nepticulidae from the Volga and Ural region
A Taxonomic Revision Of The Western Palaearctic Species Of The Subgenera Zimmermannia Hering And Ectoedemia Busck s.str. (Lepidoptera, Nepticulidae), With Notes On Their Phylogeny

Nepticulidae
Moths of Europe
Moths described in 1848